Alagwa may refer to:
Alagwa people, ethnic group in Tanzania
Alagwa language, Cushitic language of Tanzania
Alagwa (film), a 2012 Filipino film